Jean-François Domergue (born 23 June 1957) is a former French footballer who played defender. He has recently served as a manager of Le Havre AC and Montpellier HSC.

Throughout his career he was called up nine times to the France national football team, where he scored two goals – both in the semi-finals of the 1984 European Football Championship against Portugal, which France won 3–2 after extra time. France went on to win the tournament.

Honours

International 
France
 UEFA European Championship: 1984
 Artemio Franchi Cup: 1985

External links 
 
 
 

1957 births
Living people
French footballers
France international footballers
Association football defenders
French football managers
FC Girondins de Bordeaux players
Lille OSC players
Olympique Lyonnais players
Toulouse FC players
Olympique de Marseille players
Stade Malherbe Caen players
Le Havre AC managers
Montpellier HSC managers
Ligue 1 players
UEFA European Championship-winning players
UEFA Euro 1984 players